Santa Maria Joint Union High School District (SMJUHSD) operates four high schools (Delta, Ernest Righetti, Santa Maria, and Pioneer Valley) located in Santa Maria, California. Currently, 7,800 students are enrolled in this district.

History
Previously the logo had a ship in honor of Christopher Columbus, but in 2021 the district decided to remove the ship.

High schools

Santa Maria High School
Pioneer Valley High School
Ernest Righetti High School

Secondary school

Delta Continuation High School

Related school districts
Santa Maria-Bonita School District
Orcutt Union School District

References

External links
 
Delta High School
Ernest Righetti High School
Santa Maria High School
Pioneer Valley High School
Righetti High School Marching Band
Righetti Band Web Site

School districts in Santa Barbara County, California
Santa Maria, California